This article lists the stations of the Shanghai Metro, a rapid transit system serving Shanghai, China and one of the fastest-growing metro systems in the world. The first section opened in 1993, and the system currently has  of track in operation, making it one of the world's largest rapid transit system by route length and second largest by number of stations.

The tables below contain the 515 stations on the Shanghai Metro operational  (506 counting interchanges between different lines separately, with the exception of the 9 stations shared by lines 3 and 4 on the same track) of which there are 408 unique stations (counting interchange stations as one station). The stations on the Shanghai maglev train and Jinshan railway are not included, as they use  a fare system separate from and are not considered part of the Shanghai Metro network.

Line 1

Line 2

Line 3

Line 4

Line 4 is the loop-line of the Shanghai Metro.

Line 5

Line 6

Line 7

Line 8

Line 9

Line 10

Line 11

Line 12

Line 13

Line 14

Line 15

Line 16

Line 17

Line 18

Pujiang line

Station name changes
In October 2006 a new convention to naming metro stations was implemented. Station names should refer to famous streets or sights nearby rather than the vertical street neighbouring the station, making it easier for visitors to find these places. It is common for station names to change before opening, for example China Art Museum station was known as Zhoujiadu during planning. The following stations have changed names after opening.

Interchange stations
As of 2022 there are 83 interchange stations of which 11 interchange between three lines and 2 interchange between four lines.

Notes

References

External links
 Explore Shanghai Metro map

Stations
 
Lists of metro stations
Lists of railway stations in China